Adrianichthys roseni is a species of ricefish, a member of the family Adrianichthyidae which is endemic to Lake Poso on Sulawesi. Since the holotype was collected in 1978 there have been no reports of this species and if it still exists then it has a very low population. The IUCN categorise it as Critically Endangered (Possibly Extinct). The specific name honours Donn Eric Rosen (1929-1986) of the American Museum of Natural History.

References

roseni
Fish described in 2004
Taxa named by Lynne R. Parenti
Taxa named by Bambang Soeroto